Smilax pumila, the sarsaparilla vine, is a North American species of plants native to the southeastern United States from eastern Texas to South Carolina.

Smilax pumila is a prickly vine or subshrub up to 100 cm (40 inches) tall. It either runs along the ground or clambers up other vegetation. Flowers are yellow; fruits red and egg-shaped.

References

External links
Lady Bird Johnson Wildflower Center, University of Texas
Southeastern Flora
Discover Life
Texas Native Plants Database
Alabama Plants

Smilacaceae
Flora of the Southeastern United States
Plants described in 1788
Flora without expected TNC conservation status